Pasha Patriki is a Canadian cinematographer, director and film producer. He was director of photography on the films Please Kill Mr. Know It All, Gridlocked and The Sound. He was also the cinematographer on the 2016 film Anonymous (also known as Hacker), noted for its polished and crisp visuals. He is a founder of a film production & financing company, 9 Light Entertainment, which has executive-produced a number of films including Broken Mile.

In January 2017, Patriki won the award for Best Cinematography in the TV Drama category of the Canadian Society of Cinematographers Awards for the feature film Gridlocked, starring Dominic Purcell. Also in 2017, he directed Black Water, an action film starring Dolph Lundgren and Jean-Claude Van Damme, released in 2018. In September 2017, Patriki's 9 Light Entertainment partnered with a Canadian film sales and distribution firm Raven Banner Entertainment to form Hangar 18 Media, a film development and production company.

Filmography

References 

Canadian cinematographers
Canadian film producers
Canadian film directors
Living people